Bashagard County is in Hormozgan province, Iran. The capital of the county is the city of Sardasht. At the 2006 census, the region's population (as Bashagard District of Jask County) was 31,235 in 7,174 households. The following census in 2011 counted 40,007 people in 9,571 households, by which time the district had been separated from the county to form Bashagard County. At the 2016 census, the county's population was 35,085 in 9,359 households.

Administrative divisions

The population history and structural changes of Bashagard County's administrative divisions over three consecutive censuses are shown in the following table. The latest census shows three districts, six rural districts, and two cities.

References

 

Counties of Hormozgan Province